Marc Soler Giménez (born 22 November 1993) is a Spanish cyclist, who currently rides for UCI WorldTeam .

Career
Soler was born in Vilanova i la Geltru. In 2017, Soler finished third overall behind team mate Alejandro Valverde and Alberto Contador in the Volta a Catalunya, winning the young rider's classification. Later that year was named in the startlist for the Vuelta a España. 

In March 2018, he won the Paris–Nice stage race. Having started the final stage 37 seconds down on race leader Simon Yates in sixth place overall, Soler attacked around halfway into the stage along with compatriot David de la Cruz; the duo joined Omar Fraile at the head of the race, and the trio managed to stay clear of the rest of the field by the time they reached Nice. As de la Cruz and Fraile contested stage honours, Soler finished third – acquiring four bonus seconds on the finish in addition to three gained at an earlier intermediate sprint – and with a 35-second gap to Yates and the remaining general classification contenders, it was enough to give Soler victory over Yates by four seconds.

In June 2021, Soler was forced to abandon the 2021 Tour de France, after being involved in a crash on the opening stage and suffering fractures to both arms' radial heads and his left ulnar head.

Major results

2013
 1st Stage 3 Vuelta a Palencia
2014
 1st Soraluzeko Saria
 1st Ereñoko Udala Sari Nagusia
 1st Grand Prix Kutxabank
 1st Memorial Cirilo Zunzarren
 1st Stage 3 Vuelta a Zamora
 3rd Time trial, National Under-23 Road Championships
2015
 1st  Overall Tour de l'Avenir
 6th Klasika Primavera
2016
 2nd Overall Route du Sud
1st  Young rider classification
1st Stage 4
 7th Circuito de Getxo
2017
 3rd Overall Volta a Catalunya
1st  Young rider classification
 4th Time trial, National Road Championships
 5th GP Miguel Induráin
 8th Overall Tour de Suisse
  Combativity award Stage 9 Vuelta a España
2018
 1st  Overall Paris–Nice
1st  Young rider classification
 3rd Overall Vuelta a Andalucía
 5th Overall Volta a Catalunya
 6th Overall Vuelta a Aragón
 6th GP Miguel Induráin
2019
 8th Overall Vuelta a Aragón
 9th Overall Vuelta a España
2020
 1st Pollença–Andratx
 Vuelta a España
1st Stage 2
 Combativity award Stages 11, 14 & 17
 8th Overall Vuelta a Andalucía
2021
 4th Overall Tour de Romandie
1st Stage 3
2022
 Vuelta a España
1st Stage 5
 Combativity award Stage 5 & Overall
 7th Overall Tour of the Basque Country

General classification results timeline

References

External links

1993 births
Living people
Spanish male cyclists
People from Vilanova i la Geltrú
Sportspeople from the Province of Barcelona
Spanish Vuelta a España stage winners
Cyclists from Catalonia